Ayman Sawaf is a social commentator, film producer, entrepreneur, musician and author.

Sawaf has written extensively about emotional intelligence and its uses in business, parenting and personal development,

Career
Sawaf claims to be a creator of Emotional Literacy (EL), the foundation of Social Emotional Learning (SEL). He also claims to be a pioneer of Emotional Intelligence (EQ), and a co-creator of the Four Cornerstone Model.

Sawaf is a founder of Nouran Lighting, Enchanté Entertainment, Real Music, Wholelife, and Aytopia. Sawaf provides consulting services to international businesses and makes speeches worldwide.  He has spoken on Emotional Intelligence at conferences in the US, Mexico, South Africa, and Egypt.

Sawaf has Executive Produced two  Children's Films ("Magic Boat" & "Palooka") and three 13 episode television series ("Bed Time Stories" and "Mrs. Piggle Wiggle")

In 2019, Sawaf moved his family and businesses to Lebanon .

Sawaf has released13 albums and co-founded a New Age record label, Real Music. He releases his music as a solo artist as "Ayman" and under the name of his band, "Happy The Man".

Key Concepts

Emotional Literacy 
Sawaf claims to have coined the term, 'Emotional Literacy' in 1997 "Emotional Literacy is the ability to recognize, understand and appropriately express our emotions. It is the first step towards building our Emotional Intelligence (EQ) and the cornerstone of Emotional and Social Learning (SEL)," as published in The Emotional Literacy Series.

Emotional Intelligence 
"Emotional Intelligence is the ability to sense, understand, and effectively apply the power and acumen of emotions as a  source of human energy, information, connection and influence," as published in by Robert Cooper & Ayman Sawaf.In 1996, Sawaf and Robert Cooper published the book, "Executive EQ: Emotional Intelligence in Leadership and Organizations".  They claim that it is the first book to introduce Emotional Intelligence to the business world.  "Executive EQ" is published in 17 languages across 28 countries. In collaboration with Essi Systems, a consulting company, Cooper and Sawaf included an EQ Map in the book.

Ayman Sawaf has also contributed to other books on Emotional Intelligence, including
 "The Modern Day Alchemist from the Land of the Pharaohs",
 "Flip: Turn Your World Around"
 "Emotions at Work: Theory, Research and Applications for Management" edited by Roy L. Payne & Cary L. Cooper.

Sacred Commerce 
Sawaf's book, Sacred Commerce: A Blueprint for a new Humanity, explores the history  commerce through the stories of the Merchant Priesthood in Ancient Egypt.

The book also introduces the concept of the Fourth Bottom Line (Purpose), what Sawaf calls a new map for self-realization through business and sourced in Emotional Alchemy, Resonance Causation, and the "Forgotten Ingredient of Leadership"

Discography
 Moon Shines Last (1992)
 Dancing With My Soul (1994)
 Doorways (1996)
 Midnight Storyteller (2006)
 The Best of Ayman (2006)
Namya's Return (2015)
The Blue Door (2015)

Books 
 The Age of Consciousness: Surfing the Disruption  (2020)
 Sacred Commerce: A Blueprint for a New Humanity with Rowan Gabrielle (2014)
 Sacred Commerce: The Rise of the Global Citizen with Rowan Gabrielle (2007)
 Executive EQ: Emotional Intelligence in Leadership and Organizations with Robert Cooper (1997)
 The Full Original Emotional Literacy Series (Kids EQ) - 21 books (1989)

External links 
Dr. Robert Cooper,
Executive EQ: Emotional Intelligence in Leadership and Organizations.
Sacred Commerce: A Blueprint for a New Humanity,
Executive EQ,

References

External links
Ayman Sawaf

Living people
Place of birth missing (living people)
1953 births
Male non-fiction writers